Sidney Schofield (22 March 1911 – 4 December 1992) was a Labour Party politician in the United Kingdom who served as a Member of Parliament (MP) for little over a year.

Born in Pontefract, Schofield was elected MP for Barnsley at the 1951 general election.  The incumbent, Frank Collindridge, had died during the campaign for that election, and Schofield was selected as the Labour candidate in his place with a 28,227 majority; polling day was delayed to 8 November.

Schofield resigned his seat less than two years later, on 21 January 1953, "because he did not like Westminster". and at the resulting by-election on 31 March, the future cabinet minister Roy Mason was elected as his replacement, who in contrast served 34 years representing Barnsley. Schofield died in Barnsley in 1992 aged 81.

References
Notes

Sources

External links 
 

1911 births
1992 deaths
Labour Party (UK) MPs for English constituencies
National Union of Mineworkers-sponsored MPs
UK MPs 1951–1955
Politics of Barnsley
Vice Presidents of the National Union of Mineworkers (Great Britain)
Politicians from Pontefract